The Ike & Tina Turner Story: 1960–1975 is an anthology released by Time Life in 2007. It contains a 3-CD compilation with a gatefold cover and includes a 24-page booklet.

Content 
The Ike & Tina Turner Story: 1960-1975 compiles recordings that documents Ike & Tina Turner's "evolution from a sharp-dressed St. Louis-based revue, to the opening act for the Rolling Stones, to the toast of Hugh Hefner's Playboy Mansion, to headlining the Soul to Soul 1971 concert in Ghana."

The first two discs features Ike & Tina Turner's greatest hits and some live tracks. The first disc concentrates on the first half of the '60s, and the second on their late '60s and '70s work. The third disc is devoted to the entire live album In Person, originally released in 1969, which finds its first CD release on this compilation.

Critical reception 
Reviewing the album for AllMusic, Stephen Thomas Erlewine wrote:Time/Life's three-disc box The Ike & Tina Turner Story 1960-1975 comes close to being that long-awaited definitive set. It's close enough to satisfy...yet it falls just short of being the final word due to that long-standing problem of cross-licensing. Here, the blind spot is the mid- to late '60s, as this is missing the legendary Phil Spector production of "River Deep-Mountain High" and cuts that often show up on EMI-affiliated compilations, such as "Funkier Than a Mosquito's Tweeter" and other minor charting singles. These songs, especially "River Deep," are missed, but their absence hurts the set only slightly, because this traces their story very well and has all the other major hits and singles.

Track listing

References 

Ike & Tina Turner compilation albums
2007 compilation albums
Time–Life albums